Terence Bailey (born 18 December 1947) is an English former footballer who played as a midfielder. His son Mark Bailey also played professional football.

After a brief association with Winsford United, he joined Stafford Rangers in 1968. He spent six years with the club, as they finished as Cheshire County League runners-up in 1968–69, and then dominated the non-league scene of the early 1970s. His honours with the club in this period include: winners medals in the Midland Floodlight Cup, Staffordshire Senior Cup and FA Trophy; a Northern Premier League Shield runners-up medal; a Northern Premier League runners-up medal in 1970–71, and a Northern Premier League champions medal in 1971–72. He then went into the Football League with Port Vale after the club paid Rangers £3,000 in May 1974. Spending four years with the Vale, he played 190 games in league and cup, and finished as the club's joint-top scorer in 1974–75. He was sold on to non-league Northwich Victoria for £2,000 in August 1978, and later returned to Stafford Rangers.

Career
Bailey played for Winsford United in 1967–68, before joining Stafford Rangers. Rangers finished second in the Cheshire County League in 1968–69, and joined the Northern Premier League for 1969–70. They lifted the Midland Floodlight Cup in 1970, and then went on to finish as league runners-up in 1970–71, six points behind Wigan Athletic. They finished as league champions in 1971–72, two points ahead of Boston United. They also won the Staffordshire Senior Cup and the FA Trophy, beating Barnet 3–0 in the Wembley final to complete a unique treble. They did though fail to win the inaugural Northern Premier League Shield after defeat by Wigan. Rangers then finished sixth in 1972–73 and fourth in 1973–74.

Bailey was signed by Roy Sproson's Port Vale for £3,000 in May 1974. He scored a brace on his debut to earn Vale a point at Wrexham on 17 August 1974. He was the club's joint-top scorer in the 1974–75 season with fourteen goals (tied with former Rangers teammate Ray Williams). The club narrowly missed out on promotion out of the Third Division, finishing four points behind third place Charlton Athletic.

Bailey hit nine goals in 49 games in 1975–76, this left him as the club's second highest scorer along with Derek Brownbill, behind new signing and another former Ranger Mick Cullerton on 21 goals. He again scored twice against Wrexham, and also bagged a brace against Swindon Town. The "Valiants" struggled in 1976–77, and Bailey only managed two goals in 49 games, scoring against Brighton & Hove Albion and Oxford United. He hit four goals in 44 games in 1977–78, as the club suffered relegation into the Fourth Division under new manager Bobby Smith. After appearing against Chester in the League Cup in 1978–79, manager Dennis Butler sold Bailey on to Northern Premier League side Northwich Victoria for a £2,000 fee in August 1978. He had played a total of 190 games (165 in the league) and scored 29 goals (26 in the league) in his time at Vale Park. After leaving Northwich he returned to Stafford Rangers.

Career statistics
Source:

Honours
Stafford Rangers
Midland Floodlight Cup: 1970
Northern Premier League: 1971–72
Staffordshire Senior Cup: 1972
FA Trophy: 1972
Northern Premier League Shield runner-up: 1972

References

1947 births
Living people
Footballers from Stoke-on-Trent
English footballers
Association football midfielders
Winsford United F.C. players
Stafford Rangers F.C. players
Port Vale F.C. players
Northwich Victoria F.C. players
Northern Premier League players
English Football League players